Nadeem Siddique  (born 28 October 1977) English professional boxer of Pakistani origin

Personal life
Siddique was born in Bradford, Yorkshire, United Kingdom. He supports his local football team Bradford City and his favorite boxer is Sugar Ray Robinson.

Amateur career
As an amateur Siddique was a 5-time Yorkshire Champion, 2x English Champion, England Schoolboy Captain and National Schoolboy Champion.

Professional career
He made his boxing debut in 2002, and competed at both light-welterweight, and welterweight where he went on to win the BBBofC Central Area welterweight title by way of 4th-round TKO. He was also British Masters Champion.

Siddique prepared for a fight against undefeated Julius Odion, however the fight was cancelled. His first loss came on his 22nd fight at the hands of then undefeated champion Martin Gethin. He came back to fight after a year off boxing for his 23rd fight against Tom Glover, an opponent he had previously defeated. Siddique was disqualified due to continuous low-blows and subsequently put boxing on hold due to a back injury.

Siddique has said he has intentions of returning to boxing, stating;
'...I've a lot to prove...I'll be back. I had a horrible back injury so it has been a nightmare... I'm still training, I'm nowhere near done...'

Siddique is now on the comeback trail with 3 fights and 3 wins and is on the verge of a major championship fight.

Championships held
 Central Area welterweight champion
 British Masters champion

Life outside boxing
Siddique is the founder of 'Make the Weight' gym; the opening of the gym was attended by boxer Mike Tyson in whose honor Siddique staged a 3-hour-long dinner-show with many A-list celebrities also in attendance. The event was dedicated to Qasim Rahman, a Tyson fan who had died just as the two prepared to meet.

In 2009, Siddique along with Junior Witter organized a charity event where they washed cars to help raise money for the victims of Gaza; Siddique had hosted a similar event in 2005 for the people of Palestine and Gaza whereby he raised £52,000. He stated 'Me and Junior have been doing loads of things for charities and with our popularity in Bradford we always raise quite a few quid...'. The boxers later took part in a charity run to help raise funds for the same cause.

References

External links
  Official Website

English male boxers
English people of Pakistani descent
Living people
Sportspeople from Bradford
1977 births
British sportspeople of Pakistani descent
Welterweight boxers